Anders August Jahre (28 May 1891 – 26 February 1982) was a Norwegian shipping magnate. Jahre was educated in law, and worked as a lawyer in Sandefjord from 1916 until 1928. Meanwhile, he was also involved in the whaling industry, and he founded the whaling company A/S Kosmos in 1928, operating out of Sandefjord. He also established Jahres Kjemiske Fabrikker, a processor of whale blubber, as well as establishing a passenger ferry line between Oslo and Kiel.

He contributed significantly to the development of the city of Sandefjord. Among other things, he financed the building of the new town hall. He was a major philanthropist, and was honoured with The Royal Norwegian Order of St. Olav in 1950 and 1962, as well as an honorary professorship at the University of Oslo in 1961. After his death, however, there was much controversy surrounding alleged tax fraud and hidden funds in overseas accounts. In 1984, the Norwegian government put forward a tax claim against the Jahre estate. A series of legal proceedings in the 2000s succeeded in returning part of the fortune to Norway from accounts on the Cayman Islands.

Foreign fortune

In 1939 Pankos Operating Company SA was incorporated as a Panamanian corporation. Throughout his lifetime, Anders Jahre steadfastly maintained that he had no ownership interest in Pankos and other foreign companies. Only after his death was it established that Jahre had controlled these entities from incorporation, and that from the 1950s onward he had been the sole owner.

During the 1950s the Norwegian authorities commenced an investigation of Jahre's connections to Pankos et al. In response and in order to conceal his ownership interest, Jahre claimed that these companies were owned by Aristotle Onassis. The investigation was put on hold when Jahre suggested that it might be possible for Norwegian companies controlled by Jahre to purchase Pankos et al.'s floating assets from Onassis at market price. Such ships would in that manner become Norwegian-flagged vessels, a goal that at the time was considered important by the Norwegian authorities. This solution was accepted and as a result large sums were transferred abroad to companies ostensibly owned by Onassis. The net result of the transaction, however, was that the cash generated by the sale of the ships was consolidated with Pankos's other assets and became a part of the capital of Jahre's hidden foreign fortune – a fortune that grew substantially in the years thereafter.

To conceal his connection with Pankos, Jahre secretly changed the name of the company in 1958 to Continental Trust Company (CTC).   A further step intended to counter speculations regarding Jahre's ownership of CTC was taken in 1976, when the shares of the company were transferred to a Bahamian (later Caymanian) trust called Continental Foundation. In 1999 Britain's highest court (sitting as the Privy Council) confirmed that Continental Foundation was not a validly established trust.

Because documents relating to CTC surfaced during an audit of Jahre's businesses in 1979, the tax authorities initiated a new round of investigations. The investigations resulted in a tax claim being levied against Jahre in 1983 in an amount in excess of 335 million Norwegian kroner, the largest tax claim that had ever been assessed in Norway for tax avoidance. The tax claim was contested and eventually accepted in 1993.

In 1994 the administrator of Jahre's estate came into possession of documents that confirmed Jahre's unlimited control over the above-referenced foreign assets, as well as Jahre's many efforts, over a period of more than 40 years, to conceal that control from the authorities.

At the time of Jahre's death in 1982 the value of the assets remaining in his foreign fortune totalled some 80 million U.S. dollars. There is no other known instance in Norway of tax avoidance on such a large scale or over such an extended period.

In 1998 Kosmos AS asserted that it was the true owner of the foreign assets. Litigation ensued, but in 2003 Kosmos AS, by its owner Eikland AS/Morits Skaugen, discontinued the proceeding.

Two Norwegian judgements, from 2002 and 2003 respectively, reflect that Anders Jahre had ultimate control and effective ownership of the above-referenced foreign fortune during his lifetime.

Through three separate settlements with, respectively, Jahre's main banking connection (Lazard) and certain Cayman interests, the Jahre estate recovered approximately 720 million Norwegian kroner.

The amount would have been substantially higher but for the actions of an expatriate Norwegian, Thorleif Monsen, who in the 1970s was based in the Cayman Islands. In that period, Monsen undertook a fiduciary role v.a.v. Jahre and his foreign fortune and acted as the straw man who, among other things, assisted with the transfer of the shares of CTC to Continental Foundation in 1976. After Jahre's death in 1982 Monsen took advantage of his fiduciary position to embezzle substantial assets from the foreign fortune. Those assets were used by Monsen and his children for private investments and personal expenses, as well as to finance legal challenges to the Jahre estate's efforts to recover and repatriate the foreign fortune.

Anders Jahre Awards for Medical Research

Jahre left monies for the two awards named after him, for research in basic and clinical medicine, and administered by the University of Oslo.  The Anders Jahre Senior Medical Prize (the main prize) commenced in 1960, and currently includes a grant of NOK 1,000,000 while the Anders Jahre Prize for Young Scientists commenced in 1965 and includes a grant of NOK 400,000.  These awards are amongst the most substantial to be offered in the Nordic biomedical research community. For a full list of winners, visit the Previous winners of the Anders Jahres Medical Research page.

References

1891 births
1982 deaths
Norwegian company founders
Norwegian businesspeople in shipping
People from Sandefjord
Norwegian philanthropists
20th-century philanthropists